Stefano Gattuso (born 3 May 1984 in Province of Bergamo, Sarnico) is an Italian racing driver. He has competed in such series as the Italian Formula Three Championship, the FIA GT Championship and the FIA GT3 European Championship. He was champion in the 2005 Italian Formula 3000 season in the Light Class Championship and also raced in the 2006 season.

Racing career highlights

 2011 - First in International GT Open.
 2009 - FIA GT3 Ferrari Manufacturers Cup champion.
 2005 - Italien Formula 3000 Light champion.

Racing career summary

 2013	12 races.	0 wins.	0 podiums.	0 pole positions.	1 fastest race lap.
 2012	12 races.	0 wins.	3 podiums.	1 pole position.	0 fastest race laps.
 2011	16 races.	7 wins.	12 podiums.	2 pole positions.	3 fastest race laps.
 2010	14 races.	3 wins.	7 podiums.	2 pole positions.	2 fastest race laps.
 2009	13 races.	1 win.	5 podiums.	0 pole positions.	1 fastest race lap.
 2008	12 races.	0 wins.	1 podium.	? pole positions.	? fastest race laps.
 2007	11 races.	0 wins.	0 podiums.	0 pole positions.	? fastest race laps.
 2006	13 races.	0 wins.	2 podiums.	0 pole positions.	0 fastest race laps.
 2005	8 races.	6 wins.	8 podiums.	6 pole positions.	7 fastest race laps.
 2004	14 races.	1 win.	2 podiums.	1 pole position.	1 fastest race lap.
 2003	9 races.	0 wins.	1 podium.	0 pole positions.	0 fastest race laps.
 2002	6 races.	0 wins.	0 podiums.	0 pole positions.	0 fastest race laps.

References

External links
 
 

1984 births
Living people
Sportspeople from the Province of Bergamo
Italian racing drivers
Italian Formula Renault 2.0 drivers
Italian Formula Three Championship drivers
Auto GP drivers
FIA GT Championship drivers
Blancpain Endurance Series drivers
International GT Open drivers
24 Hours of Spa drivers

Team Lazarus drivers
Ombra Racing drivers
Porsche Supercup drivers
AF Corse drivers